Richard John Landon (born 22 March 1970) is an English former footballer who played as a forward. He made 83 appearances in the Football League for Plymouth Argyle, Stockport County, Rotherham United and Macclesfield Town.

Life and career
Landon combined his job as a part-time player with an office job before entering the professional game. While at his desk, he was told he had phone call waiting from Peter Shilton, who had spotted him playing for Bedworth United. He almost did not take the call, believing it to be a wind-up. He accepted an offer of a trial from Plymouth Argyle and impressed, which led to a £30,000 transfer. He scored five goals in his first eight appearances for the club, including a hat-trick in their 8–1 win at Hartlepool United on 7 May 1994. The following season was a disappointing one for Landon, having suffered a number of injuries. He scored another seven goals before new manager Neil Warnock sold him to Stockport County for £50,000. Two spells with Macclesfield Town and one with Rotherham United followed before he finished his career back in non-league football. He returned to Stockport County after retiring from playing as the club's kit man.
He has two sons, Jaidan and Zak and daughter Grace.

References

External links

1970 births
Living people
Sportspeople from Worthing
English footballers
Association football forwards
Atherstone Town F.C. players
Stratford Town F.C. players
Bedworth United F.C. players
Plymouth Argyle F.C. players
Stockport County F.C. players
Macclesfield Town F.C. players
Rotherham United F.C. players
Hednesford Town F.C. players
Altrincham F.C. players
Droylsden F.C. players
Vauxhall Motors F.C. players
Radcliffe F.C. players
Cheadle Town F.C. players
English Football League players
National League (English football) players
Stockport County F.C. non-playing staff